The following is a timeline of the history of the city of Ibadan, Oyo State, Nigeria.

Prior to 20th century

 1835 – Oluyole becomes Olubadan.
 1851 – Anglican Church Mission established by David Hinderer.
 1900 – Lagos-Ibadan railway begins operating

20th century

 1913 – Ibadan Grammar School established.
 1916 – Moor Plantation established near Ibadan.
 1929 – Government College founded.
 1947 – Economic protest.
 1948 – University College of Ibadan and its Botanical Garden established.
 1949 – Nigerian Tribune newspaper begins publication.
 1951 – Ibadan Peoples Party organized.
 1952 – Population: 459,196.
 1954 – Nigerian Records Office headquartered in Ibadan.
 1955
 Historical Society of Nigeria founded in Ibadan.
 Isaac Babalola Akinyele becomes Olubadan.
 1957 – Black Orpheus literary magazine begins publication.
 1958 – Nigerian National Archives headquartered in city.
 1959 – Western Nigerian Government Broadcasting Corporation (WNTV) television begins broadcasting (later NTA Ibadan).
 1960
 Liberty Stadium opens.
 Nigerian Institute of Social and Economic Research headquartered in city.
 1961 – Mbari Writers and Artists Club formed.
 1962 – University of Ibadan active; Institute of African Studies founded.
 1963 – Population: 627,380.
 1965 – Cocoa House built.
 1967 – International Institute of Tropical Agriculture headquartered in city.
 1975
 Population: 847,000.
 David Jemibewon becomes governor of Oyo State.
 1976
 City becomes capital of Oyo State.
 Akinyele, Lagelu, and Oluyole semi-urban local governments created.
 1982 – Leventis United football team formed.
 1989 – Egbeda, Ido, and Ona Ara semi-urban local governments created.
 1991 – Ibadan North, Ibadan North-East, Ibadan North-West, Ibadan South-East, and Ibadan South-West urban local governments created.
 1999 –  becomes Olubadan

21st century

 2003
 Ibadan Internet Exchange commissioned.
 Rashidi Adewolu Ladoja becomes governor of Oyo State.
 2007 – Oyekunle Ayinde Olukotun becomes Olubadan.
 2011
 Abiola Ajimobi becomes governor of Oyo State.
 Population: 2,949,000 (urban agglomeration).

See also
 Ibadan history
 List of Olubadan
 Timelines of other cities in Nigeria: Kano, Lagos, Port Harcourt

References

This article incorporates information from the Yoruba Wikipedia.

Bibliography

External links

  (Bibliography of open access  articles)
  (Images, etc.)
  (Images, etc.)
  (Bibliography)
  (Bibliography)
  (Bibliography)
 
 

 
Ibadan
ibadan